The Time Wanderers (also known as The Waves Extinguish the Wind) is a 1985 science fiction novel by Soviet writers Boris and Arkady Strugatsky, set in the Noon Universe. The book is narrated by Maxim Kammerer, and tells the story of The Great Revelation.

Plot summary 

The principal characters are Maxim Kammerer and Toivo Glumov, both working for an organization which investigates "Unexplained Events" (UEs). Their investigation of a series of events leads them to believe that they are witnesses to a new action by the Wanderers.

After much investigation, the UEs are discovered to be the work of a secret society called the Ludens. They claim to have chosen this name for themselves as a derivative of the Russian word lyudi "humans", "people" with several semi-jocular allusions such as the popular Latin phrase Homo Ludens "the Playing Man" and an anagram of the Russian word nelyudi "inhuman people" (as they believe they are regarded by some "ordinary" humans). The Ludens are born human, but possess latent mental powers far beyond those of normal humans. They view themselves as a distinct species, and claim to have "different interests" from humanity at large, in some instances claiming to be above traditional human morality. The Ludens routinely conduct experiments on humans and alter their minds in order to further their own means.

Kammerer and Glumov's investigation unmasks the Ludens, and they are made public in what would later become  known as "The Great Revelation". It turns out that Glumov possesses this capacity, and must now decide whether or not to become a Luden himself. He at first states that to join the Ludens would be a betrayal of his family, friends, and human civilization. But he decides to try it out, if only to serve as Humanity's "ambassador" with them. Soon all contacts with Glumov are lost, Kammerer hypothesizing that he "just forgot about us now".  Indeed, the story is told as Maxim's memoir, his sole intent in writing it being to clear up the story of Glumov: another source (in the fictional setting) had implied that Glumov was in the Luden group all along.

See also 
 Hermann Hesse's The Glass Bead Game ("Magister Ludi")

Bibliography 
 Strugatsky, Arkady and Boris. The Time Wanderers translated by Antonina W. Bouis. New York: Richardson & Steirman, March 25, 1987, 213 pp. .
 Strugatsky, Arkady and Boris. The Time Wanderers translated by Antonina W. Bouis. New York: St. Martin's Press, May, 1988, 213 pp. .

External links 
 The Time Wanderers by Arkady and Boris Strugatsky on the Perm mirror of Maxim Moshkow Library.
 The Time Wanderers by Arkady and Boris Strugatsky in the Meta.Ua Library.

1985 novels
1985 in the Soviet Union
1985 science fiction novels
Soviet science fiction novels
Noon Universe novels
Novels by Arkady and Boris Strugatsky